Do It Like an Hombre is a 2017 Mexican-Chilean comedy-drama film written and directed Nicolás López. The film starred by Mauricio Ochmann, Alfonso Dosal and Aislinn Derbez in lead roles along with Humberto Busto, Ignacia Allamand and Ariel Levy.

The film grossed $182.17 million pesos in Mexico, and is the sixth highest-grossing Mexican film.

Plot 
Raúl (Mauricio Ochmann), Eduardo (Humberto Busto), and Santiago (Alfonso Dosal) led a happy and stereotypically "masculine" life from childhood until Santiago comes out to them as gay.

Raúl reacts negatively and tries to convince Santiago that it's just a phase, damaging their relationship. Santiago begins a relationship with Julián, a famous chef, and plans to move to Miami with him to start a new life, which makes Raúl jealous and causes conflicts that eventually lead to them cutting each other off. Meanwhile, Raúl's wife, Luciana, discovers that he has been flirting with other women and arranging hookups, and seeks a divorce.

Losing two important relationships makes Raúl reevaluate his views on masculinity, friendship, and love. Eventually, Santiago backs down from his plans to move when he discovers Julián is polyamorous and not interested in a monogamous relationship. Raúl apologizes to Santiago, and they reconcile.

In the final scene, a couple of years later, Raúl is still trying to regain Luciana's love and forgiveness, but she remains hesitant. Santiago is dating an employee of Eduardo, and Raúl seems more accepting of his friend's homosexuality, but he still reacts with discomfort to seeing his own son playing with a doll, hinting at potential future conflicts.

Cast 
 Mauricio Ochmann as Raúl
 Alfonso Dosal as Santiago
 Aislinn Derbez as Nati, Santiago's girlfriend.
 Humberto Busto as Eduardo
 Ignacia Allamand as Luciana, Raúl's wife.
 Ariel Levy as Julián, Santiago's boyfriend.
 Luis Pablo Román as Raúl's therapist.

Criticism 
GLAAD criticized the film as especially homophobic in its 2018 report "Studio Responsibility Index" stating: "Overall, this movie contained so much anti-gay language and sentiment played for laughs, that Raúl coming around is barely consequential. While this film did pass the Vito Russo Test by including an LGBTQ character who was significant to the plot and had the same sort of unique personality traits as non-LGBTQ 
characters, it does not stop the film from being incredibly offensive."

References

External links 
 
Hazlo como Hombre on Pantaya

Mexican LGBT-related films
Chilean LGBT-related films
Chilean comedy-drama films
Mexican comedy-drama films
LGBT-related comedy-drama films
2017 LGBT-related films
2017 films
2017 comedy-drama films
2010s Mexican films
2010s Chilean films